Kiwi are flightless birds endemic to New Zealand of the order Apterygiformes.
The five extant species fall into the family Apterygidae and genus Apteryx. Approximately the size of a domestic chicken, kiwi are the smallest living ratites (which also include ostriches, emus, rheas and cassowaries).

DNA sequence comparisons have yielded the conclusion that kiwi are much more closely related to the extinct Malagasy elephant birds than to the moa with which they shared New Zealand. There are five recognised species, four of which are currently listed as vulnerable, and one of which is near-threatened. All species have been negatively affected by historic deforestation, but their remaining habitat is well-protected in large forest reserves and national parks. At present, the greatest threat to their survival is predation by invasive mammalian predators.

Kiwi eggs are one of the largest in proportion to body size (up to 20% of the female's weight) of any order of bird in the world. Other unique adaptations of kiwi, such as their hairlike feathers, short and stout legs, and using their nostrils at the end of their long beak to detect prey before they see it, have helped the bird to become internationally well-known.

The kiwi is recognised as an icon of New Zealand, and the association is so strong that the term Kiwi is used internationally as the colloquial demonym for New Zealanders.

Etymology

The Māori language word  is generally accepted to be "of imitative origin" from the call. However, some linguists derive the word from Proto-Nuclear Polynesian , which refers to Numenius tahitiensis, the bristle-thighed curlew, a migratory bird that winters in the tropical Pacific islands. With its long decurved bill and brown body, the curlew resembles the kiwi. So when the first Polynesian settlers arrived, they may have applied the word kiwi to the new-found bird. The word is usually uncapitalised when used for the birds. The plural is either the anglicised kiwis or, consistent with the Māori language, appearing as kiwi without an ‑s.

Taxonomy and systematics
Although it was long presumed that the kiwi was closely related to the other New Zealand ratites, the moa, recent DNA studies have identified its closest relative as the extinct elephant bird of Madagascar, and among extant ratites, the kiwi is more closely related to the emu and the cassowaries than to the moa.

Research published in 2013 on an extinct genus, Proapteryx, known from the Miocene deposits of the Saint Bathans Fauna, found that it was smaller and probably capable of flight, supporting the hypothesis that the ancestor of the kiwi reached New Zealand independently from moas, which were already large and flightless by the time kiwi appeared.

Species
There are five known species of kiwi, with a number of subspecies.
Relationships in the genus Apteryx

{| class="wikitable"
|-
! Image !! Scientific name  !! Common name  !! Distribution !! Description
|-
It has grey-brown plumage with lighter bands. The female lays one egg a year, which both parents incubate. The population is estimated at over 20,000, distributed through the more mountainous parts of northwest Nelson, the northern West Coast, and the Southern Alps / Kā Tiritiri o te Moana of the South Island.
|-
She lays one egg, which is incubated by the male. This small, docile kiwi is unable to withstand predation by introduced pigs, stoats and cats, leading to its extinction on the mainland. There are about 1350 on Kapiti Island and it has been introduced to other predator-free islands, where it appears to be getting established with about 50 on each island.
|-
| || Apteryx rowi||Okarito kiwi, rowi or Okarito brown kiwi || South Island || The Okarito kiwi, first identified as a new species in 1994, is slightly smaller than the North Island brown kiwi, with a greyish tinge to the plumage and sometimes white facial feathers. Females lay up to three eggs in a season, each one in a different nest. Male and female both incubate. Distribution is now limited to a small area on the West Coast, but studies of ancient DNA have shown that, in prehuman times, it was far more widespread on the western side of the South Island and lived in the lower half of the North Island, where it was the only kiwi species detected.
|-
| || Apteryx australis||Southern brown kiwi, tokoeka or common kiwi || South Island ||Almost as big as the great spotted kiwi and similar in appearance to the brown kiwi, though its plumage is lighter in colour. It is relatively numerous. Ancient DNA studies have shown that, in prehuman times, the distribution of this species included the east coast of the South Island. Several subspecies are recognised:
 The Stewart Island southern brown kiwi, Apteryx australis lawryi, is from Stewart Island/Rakiura.
 The northern Fiordland tokoeka (Apteryx australis ?) and southern Fiordland tokoeka (Apteryx australis ?) live in Fiordland, the remote southwest part of the South Island.
 The Haast southern brown kiwi or Haast tokoeka, ''Apteryx australis 'Haast, is the rarest taxon of kiwi with only about 300 individuals. It was identified as a distinct form in 1993. This form is distinguished by a more strongly downcurved bill and more rufous plumage.
|-
The plumage is streaky red-brown and spiky. The female usually lays two eggs, which are incubated by the male. The North Island brown has demonstrated a remarkable resilience: it adapts to a wide range of habitats, including non-native forests and some farmland.
|-
|}

Description

Their adaptation to a terrestrial life is extensive: like all the other ratites (ostrich, emu, rhea and cassowary), they have no keel on the sternum to anchor wing muscles. The vestigial wings are so small that they are invisible under the bristly, hair-like, two-branched feathers. While most adult birds have bones with hollow insides to minimise weight and make flight practicable, kiwi have marrow, like mammals and the young of other birds. Like most other ratites, they have no uropygial gland (preen gland). Their bill is long, pliable and sensitive to touch, and their eyes have a reduced pecten. Their feathers lack barbules and aftershafts, and they have large vibrissae around the gape. They have 13 flight feathers, no tail and a small pygostyle. Their gizzard is weak and their caecum is long and narrow.

The eye of the kiwi is the smallest relative to body mass in all avian species, resulting in the smallest visual field as well. The eye has small specialisations for a nocturnal lifestyle, but kiwi rely more heavily on their other senses (auditory, olfactory, and somatosensory system). The sight of the kiwi is so underdeveloped that blind specimens have been observed in nature, showing how little they rely on sight for survival and foraging. In an experiment, it was observed that one-third of a population of A. rowi in New Zealand under no environmental stress had ocular lesions in one or both eyes. The same experiment examined three specific specimens that showed complete blindness and found them to be in good physical standing outside of ocular abnormalities. A 2018 study revealed that the kiwi's closest relatives, the extinct elephant birds, also shared this trait despite their great size.

Unlike virtually every other palaeognath, which are generally small-brained by bird standards, kiwi have proportionally large encephalisation quotients. Hemisphere proportions are even similar to those of parrots and songbirds, though there is no evidence of similarly complex behaviour.

Behaviour and ecology

Before the arrival of humans in the 13th century or earlier, New Zealand's only endemic mammals were three species of bat, and the ecological niches that in other parts of the world were filled by creatures as diverse as horses, wolves and mice were taken up by birds (and, to a lesser extent, reptiles, insects and gastropods).

The kiwi's mostly nocturnal habits may be a result of habitat intrusion by predators, including humans. In areas of New Zealand where introduced predators have been removed, such as sanctuaries, kiwi are often seen in daylight. They prefer subtropical and temperate podocarp and beech forests, but they are being forced to adapt to different habitat, such as sub-alpine scrub, tussock grassland, and the mountains. Kiwi have a highly developed sense of smell, unusual in a bird, and are the only birds with nostrils at the end of their long beaks. Kiwi eat small invertebrates, seeds, grubs, and many varieties of worms. They also may eat fruit, small crayfish, eels and amphibians. Because their nostrils are located at the end of their long beaks, kiwi can locate insects and worms underground using their keen sense of smell, without actually seeing or feeling them. This sense of smell is due to a highly developed olfactory chamber and surrounding regions. It is a common belief that the kiwi relies solely on its sense of smell to catch prey but this has not been scientifically observed. Lab experiments have suggested that A. australis can rely on olfaction alone but is not consistent under natural conditions. Instead, the kiwi may rely on auditory and/or vibrotactile cues.

Once bonded, a male and female kiwi tend to live their entire lives as a monogamous couple. During the mating season, June to March, the pair call to each other at night, and meet in the nesting burrow every three days. These relationships may last for up to 20 years. They are unusual among other birds in that, along with some raptors, they have a functioning pair of ovaries. (In most birds and in platypuses, the right ovary never matures, so that only the left is functional.Fitzpatrick, F.L., (1934). Unilateral and bilateral ovaries in raptorial birds. The Wilson Bulletin, 46(1): 19-22) 

Kiwi eggs can weigh up to one-quarter the weight of the female. Usually, only one egg is laid per season. The kiwi lays one of the largest eggs in proportion to its size of any bird in the world, so even though the kiwi is about the size of a domestic chicken, it is able to lay eggs that are about six times the size of a chicken's egg. The eggs are smooth in texture, and are ivory or greenish white. The male incubates the egg, except for the great spotted kiwi, A. haastii, in which both parents are involved. The incubation period is 63–92 days. Producing the huge egg places significant physiological stress on the female; for the thirty days it takes to grow the fully developed egg, the female must eat three times her normal amount of food. Two to three days before the egg is laid there is little space left inside the female for her stomach and she is forced to fast.

It was believed that the large eggs were a trait of much larger moa-like ancestors, and that kiwi retained large eggs as an evolutionarily neutral trait as they became smaller. However, research in the early 2010s suggested that kiwi were descended from smaller flighted birds that flew to New Zealand and Madagascar, where they gave rise to kiwi and elephant birds. The large egg is instead thought to be an adaptation for precocity, enabling kiwi chicks to hatch mobile and with yolk to sustain them for two and half weeks. The large eggs would be safe in New Zealand's historical absence of egg-eating ground predators, while the mobile chicks would be able to evade chick-eating flying predators.

Lice in the genus Apterygon and in the subgenus Rallicola (Aptericola) are exclusively ectoparasites of kiwi species.

Status and conservation

Nationwide studies show that only around 5–10% of kiwi chicks survive to adulthood without management. As at 2018 over 70% of Kiwi populations are unmanaged. However, in areas under active pest management, survival rates for North Island brown kiwi can be far higher. For example, prior to a joint 1080 poison operation undertaken by DOC and the Animal Health Board in Tongariro Forest in 2006, 32 kiwi chicks were radio-tagged. 57% of the radio-tagged chicks survived to adulthood.

Efforts to protect kiwi have had some success, and in 2017 two species were downlisted from endangered to vulnerable by the IUCN. In 2018 the Department of Conservation released its current Kiwi Conservation Plan.

Sanctuaries
In 2000, the Department of Conservation set up five kiwi sanctuaries focused on developing methods to protect kiwi and to increase their numbers.
There are three kiwi sanctuaries in the North Island:
Whangarei Kiwi Sanctuary (for Northland brown kiwi)
Moehau Kiwi Sanctuary on the Coromandel Peninsula (Coromandel brown kiwi)
Tongariro Kiwi Sanctuary near Taupo (western brown kiwi)
and two in the South Island:
Okarito Kiwi Sanctuary (Okarito kiwi)
Haast Kiwi Sanctuary (Haast tokoeka)

A number of other mainland conservation islands and fenced sanctuaries have significant populations of kiwi, including:
 Zealandia fenced sanctuary in Wellington (little spotted kiwi)
 Maungatautari Restoration Project in Waikato (brown kiwi)
 Bushy Park Forest Reserve near Kai Iwi, Whanganui (brown kiwi)
 Otanewainuku Forest in the Bay of Plenty Region (brown kiwi)
 Hurunui Mainland Island, south branch, Hurunui River, North Canterbury (great spotted kiwi)

North island brown kiwi were introduced to the Cape Sanctuary in Hawke's Bay between 2008 and 2011, which in turn provided captive-raised chicks that were released back into Maungataniwha Native Forest.

Sanctuaries for kiwi are also referred to as 'kōhanga sites' from the Māori word for 'nest' or 'nursery'.

Operation Nest Egg

Operation Nest Egg is a programme run by the BNZ Save the Kiwi Trust—a partnership between the Bank of New Zealand, the Department of Conservation and the Royal Forest and Bird Protection Society. Kiwi eggs and chicks are removed from the wild and hatched and/or raised in captivity until big enough to fend for themselves—usually when they weigh around 1200 grams (42 ounces). They are then returned to the wild. An Operation Nest Egg bird has a 65% chance of surviving to adulthood—compared to just 5% for wild-hatched and raised chicks. The tool is used on all kiwi species except little spotted kiwi.

1080 poison

In 2004, anti-1080 activist Phillip Anderton posed for the New Zealand media with a kiwi he claimed had been poisoned. An investigation revealed that Anderton lied to journalists and the public. He had used a kiwi that had been caught in a possum trap. Extensive monitoring shows that kiwi are not at risk from the use of biodegradable 1080 poison.

Threats
Introduced mammalian predators, namely stoats, dogs, ferrets, and cats, are the principal threats to kiwi. The biggest threat to kiwi chicks is stoats, while dogs are the biggest threat to adult kiwi. Stoats are responsible for approximately half of kiwi chick deaths in many areas through New Zealand. Cats also to a lesser extent prey on kiwi chicks. These predators can cause large and abrupt declines in populations. In particular, dogs find the distinctive strong scent of kiwi irresistible and easy to track, such that they can catch and kill kiwi in seconds. Motor vehicle strike is a threat to all kiwi where roads cross through their habitat. Badly set possum traps often kill or maim kiwi.

Habitat destruction is another major threat to kiwi; restricted distribution and small size of some kiwi populations increases their vulnerability to inbreeding. Research has shown that the combined effect of predators and other mortality (accidents etc.) results in less than 5% of kiwi chicks surviving to adulthood.

Relationship to humans

The Māori traditionally believed that kiwi were under the protection of Tāne Mahuta, god of the forest. They were used as food and their feathers were used for kahu kiwi—ceremonial cloaks. Today, while kiwi feathers are still used, they are gathered from birds that die naturally, through road accidents,  or predation, and from captive birds. Kiwi are no longer hunted and some Māori consider themselves the birds' guardians.

Scientific documentation
In 1813, George Shaw named the genus Apteryx in his species description of the southern brown kiwi, which he called "the southern apteryx". Captain Andrew Barclay of the ship Providence provided Shaw with the specimen. Shaw's description was accompanied by two plates, engraved by Frederick Polydore Nodder; they were published in volume 24 of The Naturalist's Miscellany.

Zoos
In 1851, London Zoo became the first zoo to keep kiwi. The first captive breeding took place in 1945. As of 2007 only 13 zoos outside New Zealand hold kiwi. The Frankfurt Zoo has 12, the Berlin Zoo has seven, Walsrode Bird Park has one, the Avifauna Bird Park in the Netherlands has three, the San Diego Zoo has five, the San Diego Zoo Safari Park has one, the National Zoo in Washington, DC has eleven, the Smithsonian Conservation Biology Institute has one, and the Columbus Zoo and Aquarium has three.

As a national symbol

The kiwi as a symbol first appeared in the late 19th century in New Zealand regimental badges. It was later featured in the badges of the South Canterbury Battalion in 1886 and the Hastings Rifle Volunteers in 1887. Soon after, the kiwi appeared in many military badges; and in 1906, when Kiwi Shoe Polish was widely sold in the UK and the US, the symbol became more widely known.

During the First World War, the name "Kiwis" for New Zealand soldiers came into general use, and a giant kiwi (now known as the Bulford kiwi) was carved on the chalk hill above Sling Camp in England. Usage has become so widespread that all New Zealanders overseas and at home are now commonly referred to as "Kiwis".

The kiwi has since become the best-known national symbol for New Zealand, and the bird is prominent in the coat of arms, crests and badges of many New Zealand cities, clubs and organisations. At the national level, the red silhouette of a kiwi is in the centre of the roundel of the Royal New Zealand Air Force. The kiwi is featured in the logo of the New Zealand Rugby League, and the New Zealand national rugby league team are nicknamed the Kiwis.

A kiwi has featured on the reverse side of three New Zealand coins: the one florin (two-shilling) coin from 1933 to 1966, the twenty-cent coin from 1967 to 1990, and the one-dollar coin since 1991. In currency trading the New Zealand dollar is often referred to as "the kiwi".

See also

 Birds of New Zealand
 Conservation in New Zealand

References

Notes

Further reading
 Burbidge, M.L., Colbourne, R.M., Robertson, H.A., and Baker, A.J. (2003). Molecular and other biological evidence supports the recognition of at least three species of brown kiwi. Conservation Genetics, 4(2):167–77
 Cooper, Alan et al. (2001). Complete mitochondrial genome sequences of two extinct moas clarify ratite evolution. Nature, 409''': 704–07.
 SavetheKiwi.org 
 
 Le Duc, D., G. Renaud, A. Krishnan, M.S. Almen, L. Huynen, S. J. Prohaska, M. Ongyerth, B. D. Bitarello, H. B. Schioth, M. Hofreiter, et al. 2015. Kiwi genome provides insights into the evolution of a nocturnal lifestyle. Genome Biology 16:147–162.

External links

 .
 .
 .
 .
 .
 .
 .
 .
 .

 
Novaeratitae
Flightless birds
Higher-level bird taxa restricted to New Zealand
Endemic birds of New Zealand
Ratites
National symbols of New Zealand
Extant Miocene first appearances
Taxa named by George Shaw